Royal Air Force Colerne or more simply RAF Colerne is a former Royal Air Force station which was on the outskirts of the village of Colerne in Wiltshire, England, and was in use from 1939 to 1976.

The site is now known as Azimghur Barracks and is home to 21 Signal Regiment, Royal Signals and 93 (City of Bath) Air Training Corps detached flight.

History

Second World War
Originally there had been a farm called Doncombe and a vineyard on the site of the airfield, the names of Doncombe Lane and Doncombe Hill being the last link to the farm.

From 1940 to 1955 RAF Fighter Command units were based here. During the Battle of Britain the airfield served as a satellite field to RAF Middle Wallop, and squadrons rotated back and forth from there on a daily basis.

Later it was a training station for night fighter navigators. Using the latest night fighter procedures, the unit involved was No. 238 Operational Conversion Unit RAF from June 1952 until January 1957 and Bristol Brigand twin engine aircraft were used for this purpose. They also operated Bristol Buckmaster Aircraft for pilot training, and a number of Boulton Paul Balliol aircraft – an advanced pilot trainer powered by a Rolls-Royce Merlin engine. The pilot and trainee sat side-by-side in the wide fuselage, and the Balliols were used as targets for the Brigand aircraft to practice radar interceptions on.

The following units were here during the Second World War:
 Aircraft Delivery Flight, Colerne RAF became No. 2 Aircraft Delivery Flight RAF (March 1941 - July 1943)
 No. 2 Supplementary School of Technical Training RAF (March - May 1941)
 No. 4 Aircraft Assembly Unit RAF (July 1940 - March 1942) became No. 218 Maintenance Unit RAF (March 1942 - February 1948)
 No. 10 Group Communication Flight RAF (July 1940 - April 1945)
 No. 149 (Long Range Fighter) Wing RAF (July - September 1944)
 No. 1454 (Fighter) Flight RAF (June 1941 - January 1942)
 No. 1457 (Fighter) Flight RAF (September - November 1941)
 Detachment of No. 1487 (Fighter) Gunnery Flight RAF (January - February 1943)
 No. 1498 (Target Towing) Flight RAF (August - September 1943)
 Fortress Flight RAF (1942 - October 1942)
 Special Installation Flight RAF (August 1942 - February 1948 & October 1953 - March 1962)

Cold War and closure
Between 4 May 1948 and 1 March 1962, No. 49 Maintenance Unit RAF was based at the airfield.

After this period it became a Transport Command airfield, and Handley Page Hastings aircraft were flown from RAF Colerne. After the demise of the Hastings and the introduction of the new Lockheed C-130 Hercules to the RAF Air Support Command, the front-line transport role was relinquished. The Hercules were based at RAF Lyneham, also in Wiltshire, and for many years major servicing of the Hercules was carried out at RAF Colerne by the Air Engineering Squadron, until the station closed in 1976.

C-130 Hercules aircraft XV198 crashed, killing all crew on board, here in September 1973.

Colerne was also the home of No. 2 Field Squadron RAF Regiment from 1962 to 1975.  For a number of years up until its closure as an RAF station it housed one of the RAF's regional collections of historic aircraft, including Neville Duke's world-record-breaking Hawker Hunter and a rare example of the rocket-engined Messerschmitt Me 163 B, Werknummer 191904 (since returned to Germany).

From 1966, the Skynet satellite communications system, a Signal Unit with its main base at RAF Oakhanger, had a detachment at Colerne.

The following units were here during the Cold War:
 No. 3 Air Experience Flight RAF (1993 - ?)
 No. 24 Group Communication Flight RAF (January 1960 - April 1964)
 No. 27 (Signals Training) Group RAF (September 1949 - July 1953)
 No. 27 Group Communication Flight RAF (September 1949 - July 1952)
 No. 62 Group Communication Flight RAF (January 1948 - July 1952) became Colerne Communication Squadron RAF (August 1942 - July 1957) absorbed by No. 81 Group Communication Flight RAF (January 1952 - April 1958)
 No. 92 Gliding School RAF (February 1948 - September 1955)
 Detachment of No. 228 Operational Conversion Unit RAF (January - May 1957)
 Detachment of No. 238 Maintenance Unit RAF (April 1956 - July 1958)
 No. 1335 (Meteor) Conversion Unit RAF (March - July 1945)
 No. 1956 Air Observation Post Flight RAF (February 1949 - March 1957)
 No. 1963 Air Observation Post Flight RAF (February 1949 - March 1957)
 Airborne Interception School RAF (June 1952) became 238 OCU
 Bristol University Air Squadron (November 1992 - ?)

British Army units
The site was used by the British Army as its training facility for the Junior Leaders Regiment of the Royal Corps of Transport and Royal Army Ordnance Corps.  Young men from the age of 16 were trained in a variety of the skills needed to enable them to become better soldiers in the army. Basic driver training was done on simulators, and car driver training to licence level and motorcycle training were undertaken here.

The Regiment consisted of 30 (Junior Leader) Squadron RCT, 57 (Junior Leader) Squadron RCT and 90 (Junior Leader) Squadron RCT, together with 88 (Junior Leader) Coy RAOC.

Estranged from the regiment, at Driffield in Yorkshire, was 32 Driver Training Squadron RCT.  Here, young soldiers were sent to the ASMT at Defence School of Transport (Leconfield) to be taught to drive the basic vehicles of the Army (typically a Land Rover and a 4-tonne lorry) and to qualify as Driver Trade B3 before being posted to a full-time working regiment where their technical trade training would be continued.

Post-RAF use
After the RAF station closed in 1976, the site was taken over by the Army; occasional flying by Air Cadets continues. The airfield is expected to be closed in 2025.

Units

See also
 List of Battle of Britain airfields
 List of Battle of Britain squadrons

References

Citations

Bibliography

External links

Royal Air Force stations in Wiltshire